The Croatian Ice Hockey League Season for 2006-2007 was the 17th such season. It was won by KHL Mladost, making it the team's first championship in the league. This put an end to the eleven straight season championship run by KHL Medveščak.

Teams
 KHL Mladost
 KHL Medveščak
 KHL Zagreb

Regular season

Playoffs
Medveščak automatically qualified for the final.

semifinal
Mladost defeated Zagreb in the semifinal series 2–0, in a best of three.
KHL Mladost – KHL Zagreb 5:0 (2:0,2:0,1:0)
KHL Zagreb – KHL Mladost 1:18 (0:8,1:6,0:4)

final
Mladost went on to stun Medveščak, winning the finals 3–1, in a best of five.
KHL Medveščak – KHL Mladost 3:8 (0:2,2:1,1:5)
KHL Mladost – KHL Medveščak 1:2 (0:1,1:1,0:0)
KHL Medveščak – KHL Mladost 2:3 SO (2:1,0:0,0:1)
KHL Mladost – KHL Medveščak 7:4 (3:0, 1:2,3:2)

Croatian Ice Hockey League
1
Croatian Ice Hockey League seasons